Mid-City, Mid City or Midcity may refer to:

 Mid-City, Los Angeles, California
 Mid-Wilshire, in Los Angeles, California
 Mid-City New Orleans, Louisiana
 Mid-Cities, Dallas-Fort Worth, Texas
 Mid City, Missouri, an unincorporated community
 Midcity, Texas, an unincorporated community
 MidCity, a shopping centre in Sydney
 MidCity District,  a retail development center in Huntsville, Alabama
 Midcity (album), an album by clipping